This is a list of notable homicides, the act of a person or persons killing another, committed by law enforcement officers in the U.S. state of Minnesota.

List of killings 
 
 Killing of Fong Lee in Minneapolis on July 22, 2006
 Killing of Jamar Clark in Minneapolis on November 15, 2015
 Killing of Philando Castile in Falcon Heights on July 6, 2016
 Killing of Justine Damond in Minneapolis on  July 15, 2017
 Murder of George Floyd in Minneapolis on May 25, 2020
 Killing of Dolal Idd in Minneapolis on December 30, 2020
 Killing of Daunte Wright in Brooklyn Center on April 11, 2021
 Killing of Winston Boogie Smith in Minneapolis on June 3, 2021
 Killing of Amir Locke in Minneapolis on February 2, 2022

See also 
 List of incidents of civil unrest in Minneapolis–Saint Paul
 Timeline of race relations and policing in Minneapolis–Saint Paul

Further reading 

Minnesota
Minnesota-related lists
People killed by law enforcement officers
History of Minnesota
Law enforcement in Minnesota